Giuseppe LaMotta (April 27, 1925 – December 29, 2020), better known as Joey LaMotta, was an American boxer who was the younger brother and one time manager of former world middleweight boxing champion, Jake LaMotta.

LaMotta also boxed for a short time in 1945 and 1946. His record was 32 wins (22 KOs), 5 losses (1 KO), and 2 draws. 

Joe Pesci was nominated for a Best Supporting Actor Academy Award for his portrayal of Joey in the 1980 film Raging Bull, a biographical film about his brother Jake's turbulent life and career.

His son, John LaMotta was an actor and also an amateur boxer who fought in the heavyweight-novice class of the 2001 Golden Gloves championship tournament.

LaMotta died on December 29, 2020, at the age of 95.

Professional boxing record

|-
|align="center" colspan=8|32 Wins (22 knockouts, 10 decisions), 5 Losses (1 knockout, 4 decisions), 2 Draws
|-
| align="center" style="border-style: none none solid solid; background: #e3e3e3"|Result
| align="center" style="border-style: none none solid solid; background: #e3e3e3"|Record
| align="center" style="border-style: none none solid solid; background: #e3e3e3"|Opponent
| align="center" style="border-style: none none solid solid; background: #e3e3e3"|Type
| align="center" style="border-style: none none solid solid; background: #e3e3e3"|Round
| align="center" style="border-style: none none solid solid; background: #e3e3e3"|Date
| align="center" style="border-style: none none solid solid; background: #e3e3e3"|Location
| align="center" style="border-style: none none solid solid; background: #e3e3e3"|Notes
|-
|Loss
|
|align=left| Freddie Flores
|PTS
|10
|1946-11-05	
|align=left| 
|align=left|
|-
|Loss
|
|align=left| Freddie Flores
|TKO
|4 (10), 
|1946-10-21	
|align=left| 
|align=left|
|-
|Loss
|
|align=left| Anton Raadik
|PTS
|10
|1946-09-12	
|align=left| 
|align=left|
|-
|Win
|
|align=left| Gene Boland
|SD
|10
|1946-08-07	
|align=left| 
|align=left|
|-
|Loss
|
|align=left| Joe Blackwood
|UD
|10
|1946-05-10	
|align=left| 
|align=left|
|-
|Draw
|
|align=left| Joe Blackwood
|PTS
|10
|1946-04-12	
|align=left| 
|align=left|
|-
|Win
|
|align=left| John Henry Johnson
|TKO
|4 (8), 
|1946-03-29	
|align=left| 
|align=left|
|-
|Win
|
|align=left| Tony Riccio
|PTS
|8
|1946-03-18	
|align=left| 
|align=left|
|-
|Win
|
|align=left| Bobby Berger
|UD
|8
|1946-03-12	
|align=left| 
|align=left|
|-
|Win
|
|align=left| Bobby Berger
|UD
|8
|1946-02-05	
|align=left| 
|align=left|
|-
|Win
|
|align=left| Art Brown
|UD
|10
|1945-12-07	
|align=left| 
|align=left|
|-
|Win
|
|align=left| Johnny Jones
|KO
|5 (8)
|1945-11-23	
|align=left| 
|align=left|
|-
|Win
|
|align=left| Andres Gomez
|KO
|2 (8), 
|1945-10-23	
|align=left| 
|align=left|
|-
|Win
|
|align=left| Larney Moore
|TKO
|5 (6), 
|1945-10-15	
|align=left| 
|align=left|
|-
|Win
|
|align=left| Dan Aldrich
|KO
|1 (8), 
|1945-10-09	
|align=left| 
|align=left|
|-
|Win
|
|align=left| Martin Doyle
|TKO
|2 (6), 
|1945-09-26	
|align=left| 
|align=left|
|-
|Win
|
|align=left| Ballesandro Carubia
|TKO
|4 (8)
|1945-09-15	
|align=left| 
|align=left|
|-
|Win
|
|align=left| Jimmy Mills
|KO
|4 (8)
|1945-09-04	
|align=left| 
|align=left|
|-
|Win
|
|align=left| Lew Perez
|KO
|2 (10)
|1945-08-13	
|align=left| 
|align=left|
|-
|Win
|
|align=left| Billy Johnson
|PTS
|6
|1945-08-10	
|align=left| 
|align=left|
|-
|Win
|
|align=left| Jack Garrity
|KO
|2 (6)
|1945-06-29	
|align=left| 
|align=left|
|-
|Win
|
|align=left| Charlie Finley
|KO
|1 (8)
|1945-06-25	
|align=left| 
|align=left|
|-
|Win
|
|align=left| Jimmy Davis
|KO
|4 (8), 
|1945-06-19	
|align=left| 
|align=left|
|-
|Win
|
|align=left| Tom Collins
|PTS
|6
|1945-06-11	
|align=left| 
|align=left|
|-
|Loss
|
|align=left| Jimmy Mills
|PTS
|7
|1945-05-16	
|align=left| 
|align=left|
|-
|Draw
|
|align=left| Jimmy Mills
|PTS
|6
|1945-05-02	
|align=left| 
|align=left|
|-
|Win
|
|align=left| Lee Black
|RTD
|3 (6)
|1945-04-28	
|align=left| 
|align=left|
|-
|Win
|
|align=left| Dave Carver
|KO
|2 (6), 
|1945-04-27	
|align=left| 
|align=left|
|-
|Win
|
|align=left| Fernand Demers
|TKO
|1 (6), 
|1945-04-20	
|align=left| 
|align=left|
|-
|Win
|
|align=left| Baudelio Valencia
|KO
|3 (6), 
|1945-04-10	
|align=left| 
|align=left|
|-
|Win
|
|align=left| Al Jackson
|KO
|1 (6), 
|1945-03-26	
|align=left| 
|align=left|
|-
|Win
|
|align=left| Jimmy Campbell
|KO
|1 (6)
|1945-03-19	
|align=left| 
|align=left|
|-
|Win
|
|align=left| Lee Black
|KO
|2 (6), 
|1945-03-13	
|align=left| 
|align=left|
|-
|Win
|
|align=left| Baudelio Valencia
|PTS
|6
|1945-03-06	
|align=left| 
|align=left|
|-
|Win
|
|align=left| Ernest Barnwell
|PTS
|6
|1945-02-27	
|align=left| 
|align=left|
|-
|Win
|
|align=left| Jerry McGee
|TKO
|2 (4)
|1945-02-24	
|align=left| 
|align=left|
|-
|Win
|
|align=left| Buddy Jackson
|KO
|1 (4), 
|1945-02-20	
|align=left| 
|align=left|
|-
|Win
|
|align=left| Lew Perez
|PTS
|4
|1945-02-13	
|align=left| 
|align=left|
|-
|Win
|
|align=left| Charley Howard
|TKO
|1 (4)
|1945-02-06	
|align=left| 
|align=left|
|-
|}

References

External links
 

1925 births
2020 deaths
20th-century American businesspeople
American people of Italian descent
American male boxers
Boxers from New York (state)
Middleweight boxers
Sportspeople from the Bronx
Boxers from New York City